Lewis is a city in Edwards County, Kansas, United States.  As of the 2020 census, the population of the city was 400.

History
Lewis was founded about 1885. It was named for journalist M.M. Lewis.

The first post office in Lewis was established in November, 1886.

Geography
Lewis is located at  (37.937014, −99.254728).

Demographics

2010 census
As of the census of 2010, there were 451 people, 183 households, and 127 families residing in the city. The racial makeup of the city was 73.4% White, 1.3% African American, 1.3% Native American, 23.1% from other races, and 0.9% from two or more races. Hispanic or Latino of any race were 43.7% of the population.

There were 183 households, of which 31.1% had children under the age of 18 living with them, 56.3% were married couples living together, 7.1% had a female householder with no husband present, 6.0% had a male householder with no wife present, and 30.6% were non-families. 26.2% of all households were made up of individuals, and 13.1% had someone living alone who was 65 years of age or older. The average household size was 2.46 and the average family size was 2.99.

The median age in the city was 43.3 years. 23.7% of residents were under the age of 18; 6.8% were between the ages of 18 and 24; 23% were from 25 to 44; 28.6% were from 45 to 64; and 17.7% were 65 years of age or older. The gender makeup of the city was 52.1% male and 47.9% female.

2000 census
As of the census of 2000, there were 486 people, 183 households, and 133 families residing in the city. The racial makeup of the city was 75.72% White, 0.21% African American, 0.82% Native American, 21.19% from other races, and 2.06% from two or more races. Hispanic or Latino of any race were 34.16% of the population.

There were 183 households, out of which 35.5% had children under the age of 18 living with them, 60.1% were married couples living together, 7.1% had a female householder with no husband present, and 26.8% were non-families. 26.2% of all households were made up of individuals, and 12.0% had someone living alone who was 65 years of age or older. The average household size was 2.66 and the average family size was 3.16.

In the city, the population was spread out, with 30.0% under the age of 18, 7.2% from 18 to 24, 27.6% from 25 to 44, 22.0% from 45 to 64, and 13.2% who were 65 years of age or older. The median age was 34 years. For every 100 females, there were 99.2 males. For every 100 females age 18 and over, there were 96.5 males.

The median income for a household in the city was $35,238, and the median income for a family was $36,750. Males had a median income of $25,114 versus $18,929 for females. The per capita income for the city was $14,085. About 11.1% of families and 13.6% of the population were below the poverty line, including 23.5% of those under age 18 and none of those age 65 or over.

Education
Lewis is a part of USD 502 and home to Lewis Elementary School.

Lewis High School was closed through school unification. The Lewis Spartans won the following Kansas State High School championships:
 1954 Boys Track & Field – Class B 
 1971 Boys Basketball – Class 1A 
 1974 Football – Class 8-Man

Media
 KPRD

References

External links
 Lewis – Directory of Public Officials
 Lewis City Map, EdwardsCounty.org
 Lewis city map, KDOT

Cities in Kansas
Cities in Edwards County, Kansas